Tiny Bounmalay (born 6 June 1993) is a Laotian professional footballer who currently plays as a midfielder for Muanghat United in the Lao League 2.and former head coach Garuda F.C. in Lao League 2 season 2020-2021

International career 
He had played for Laos U-23 team and also Laos national football team.

External links 
 
 

1993 births
Living people
Laotian footballers
Laos international footballers
Footballers at the 2014 Asian Games
Footballers at the 2018 Asian Games
Association football midfielders
Asian Games competitors for Laos